David Harding, (born 1937) is a Scottish artist best known for his residency as a town artist in the new town of Glenrothes and as Head of Environmental Art at Glasgow School of Art.

Early life and education 
Born in Leith, from 1955 to 1959 Harding attended Edinburgh College of Art, where he studied the sculptural use of glass, concrete and ceramics. He attended Moray House College of Education in 1960.

Career 
From 1961 to 1963 he taught in various schools in Scotland before moving to Nigeria (1963 - 1967) to work in the art department in a bush teacher training college. He returned from Nigeria at the age of 30 and decided to give up teaching, instead undertaking sculpture commissions.

Having spent a year as a self-employed artist, Harding answered an advert in The Scotsman for a post with Glenrothes Development Corporation. From 1968 to 1978 he was town artist, working with the planning department to create site-specific work using the same concrete and brick as the newly developed housing.  His works in Glenrothe include Henge, a spiral of cast concrete slabs; Industry, a mural on an underpass based on patterns on African huts; Heritage, rows of concrete embossed columns; Dark Cemetery in Pitteuchar; and ten poetry slabs at bus stops, phone boxes, and the Glenwood shopping centre. Henge and Industry are now listed. As his assistant, Stanley Bonnar created a concrete hippo; Harding and Bonnar placed them in groups at multiple sites in the town.

From 1978 to 1985 he lectured at Dartington College of Art in the department of Art and Social Contexts.

In 1985 Harding started teaching the new subject of Environmental Art at Glasgow School of Art; he eventually became Head of Environmental Art and Sculpture. Several of Harding's former students have been nominated for or received the Turner Prize.  He retired in 2001.

Exhibitions 
 You Like This Garden?, (with Ross Birrell) Portikus, Frankfurt, 2011.
 Winter Line (with Ross Birrell), Kunsthalle Basel, Basel, 2014.
 Where language ends (with Ross Birrell), Talbot Rice Gallery, Edinburgh, 14 March – 2 May 2015.
 Grey Gardens, Dundee Contemporary Arts, Dundee, 2016.
 Documenta 14, (with Ross Birrell) Athens and Kassel, 2017.

Honours 
Harding was awarded the OBE in the 2002 New Year Honours for services to higher education and in 2018 made an honorary D.Litt by the University of Glasgow.

Personal life 
Harding is married with six children.

References

External links 
 Official website

1937 births
Living people
20th-century Scottish male artists
21st-century Scottish male artists
Alumni of the Edinburgh College of Art
Artists from Edinburgh